Dominique Elyse Richardson (born October 18, 1992) is an American soccer player who plays for NJ/NY Gotham FC in the National Women's Soccer League (NWSL).

Club career

Houston Dash, 2014
Richardson signed with the Houston Dash after participating in open tryouts. She played in 2 games before being released by the club in May 2014.

FC Kansas City, 2015
Richardson signed with FC Kansas City as a discovery player in 2015. She was on the roster but never appeared in a game for FCKC. She was waived by the club on July 17, 2015

Sky Blue FC, 2016-
Richardson signed with Sky Blue FC in 2016.

Honors 
FC Kansas City
Winner
 National Women's Soccer League: 2015

References

External links 
 

1992 births
Living people
American women's soccer players
FC Kansas City players
Houston Dash players
Missouri Tigers women's soccer players
National Women's Soccer League players
NJ/NY Gotham FC players
Soccer players from California
Sportspeople from Fullerton, California
Women's association football defenders
African-American women's soccer players
21st-century African-American sportspeople
21st-century African-American women